Radio Industri was a radio manufacturing company in Oslo, Norway.

It was established in 1939, and produced radios for Philips. The production facility was at Sandakerveien 16 at Torshov. Philips also had a lightbulb factory named Philips Fabrikk Norsk, but it was closed in the 1980s. The whole Philips corporation in Norway moved to Sandstuveien 70 at Ryen in 1982.

References

Electronics companies of Norway
Manufacturing companies based in Oslo
Manufacturing companies established in 1939
Technology companies established in 1939
Norwegian companies established in 1939

Defunct companies of Norway
Radio manufacturers